Jesper Viftrup Kristiansen (born 27 July 1985) is a former motorcycle speedway rider from Denmark.

Speedway career
He rode in the top tier of British Speedway when making an appearance riding for the Wolverhampton Wolves during the 2009 Elite League speedway season. He began his British career riding for Stoke Potters in 2008.

References 

1985 births
Living people
Danish speedway riders
Plymouth Devils riders
Stoke Potters riders
Wolverhampton Wolves riders